Stephen Jean-Marie Pichon (10 August 1857 – 18 September 1933, Vers-en-Montagne) was a French journalist, diplomat and politician of the Third Republic. The Avenue Stéphen-Pichon in Paris is named after him.

Life

Stephen Jean-Marie Pichon was born on 10 August 1857 in Arnay-le-Duc, Côte-d'Or.

He served as French Minister to China (1897–1900), including the period of the Boxer Uprising.
Stephen Pichon was appointed Resident-General of the Tunisian Protectorate in 1901, replacing Georges Benoit.
In 1906 he was succeeded by Gabriel Alapetite.

An associate of Georges Clemenceau, he served several times under Clemenceau and others as Minister of Foreign Affairs. Stephen Pichon in Paris managed the French agreement with transformation of Czechoslovak National Council to the Provisional Czechoslovak government on 26 September 1918 (when Edvard Beneš received confirmation of Tomáš Garrigue Masaryk from Washington).

His most notable service was under Clemenceau during the latter part of the First World War and the Paris Peace Conference of 1919, but, like most of the other foreign ministers at the conference, Pichon was largely sidelined by the more forceful figure of his head of government.

Stephen Pichon died on 18 September 1933 in Vers-en-Montagne, Jura.

Honours

Knight of the Legion of Honour 31 October 1895 
Officer of the Legion of Honour 8 April 1898
Commander of the Legion of Honour 14 August 1900.
The Avenue Stéphen-Pichon in the 13th arrondissement of Paris, near the Place d'Italie, was named in his honour in 1934.
 A school in Bizerta in Tunisia has his name

Publications 

 Articles et chroniques parlementaires dans La Justice
 Écrits de publiciste dans Le Petit Journal
 La diplomatie de l’Église sous la IIIe République, édition O. Doin, 1892, 78 pages
 Rétablissement des relations diplomatiques entre la France et la République dominicaine, 1894
 Traité d'arbitrage pour la délimitation de la Guyane française, 1897
 Les derniers jours de Pékin par Pierre Loti, précédé de La Ville en flammes par Stephen Pichon, et la Défense de la légation de France par Eugène Darcy, 1902
 Dans la Bataille, essai biographique, édition A. Méricant, 1908, 314 pages 
 La Guerre et les neutres par René Moulin, préface de Stephen Pichon, 1915
 Manuscrits et correspondances, manuscrits de la bibliothèque de l'Institut de France, et de la Bibliothèque nationale de France (données Gallica).
Introduction to

References

External links

 

1857 births
1933 deaths
People from Côte-d'Or
Politicians from Bourgogne-Franche-Comté
Radical Party (France) politicians
French Foreign Ministers
Members of the 4th Chamber of Deputies of the French Third Republic
Members of the 5th Chamber of Deputies of the French Third Republic
French Senators of the Third Republic
Senators of Jura (department)
Honorary Knights Grand Cross of the Royal Victorian Order